Cilix patula is a moth in the family Drepanidae first described by Watson in 1968. It is found in Yunnan, China.

References

Moths described in 1968
Drepaninae